Glen Adjei Kamara (born 28 October 1995) is a Finnish professional footballer who plays as a midfielder for  club Rangers and the Finland national team. 

He began his senior career at Arsenal, where he made one substitute appearance in the Football League Cup and was loaned to Southend United and Colchester United. After 18 months at Dundee, he joined fellow Scottish Premiership side Rangers for £50,000. He made the PFA Scotland Team of the Year when they won the league title in 2020–21.

Kamara made his senior international debut for Finland in 2017. He was named in their squad for UEFA Euro 2020.

Club career

Youth career and Arsenal

Born in Tampere (Finland) to Sierra Leonean born-parents, Kamara started his career in England for Sunday side Westway of Ladbroke Grove, before moving to the Southend United youth system before moving to Arsenal in 2012.

At first Kamara joined up with the club's Academy. He went on to be an unused substitute for Arsenal's UEFA Champions League match against Galatasaray in December 2014. Kamara made his only appearance for Arsenal a day before his 20th birthday on 27 October 2015, up against Sheffield Wednesday in the Football League Cup fourth round in an eventual 3–0 away loss; he started the match and was substituted for Krystian Bielik after an hour.

On 22 January 2016, Kamara returned to Southend in League One, on loan for the rest of the season. He played six matches, all but one as a starter.

On deadline day of the summer transfer window upon 31 August 2016, Kamara joined Colchester United in League Two on loan until January 2017. He played six times, starting just once in the league.

Dundee
On 13 July 2017, Kamara signed a two-year deal with Dundee. He made his debut for the club in a Scottish League Cup game away to Raith Rovers where he put in a man of the match performance.

Rangers
On 5 January 2019, Kamara signed a pre-contract with Rangers on a four-and-a-half year contract. On 31 January, this deal was brought forward when the two clubs agreed to a £50,000 transfer. He scored his first goal in senior club football on 27 February 2019, opening a 4–0 home win over his former club Dundee.

On 18 March 2021, Kamara accused Slavia Prague player Ondřej Kúdela of racist verbal abuse during a Europa League knockout match. Kúdela denied the claims of racism and claimed that after the match Kamara physically assaulted Kúdela in the stadium tunnel in front of UEFA officials and Rangers manager Steven Gerrard. Ahead of the Old Firm derby, Celtic and Rangers players stood side by side in support of Kamara. On 14 April, UEFA officially found both Kamara and Kúdela guilty. Kúdela was banned for racial abuse for 10 UEFA matches, while Kamara was handed a three-match ban for assault.

On 22 September 2021, Kamara signed a new four-year contract with the club that would see him remain with the club until the summer of 2025. Days later, he was sent off away to Sparta Prague, a game in which his every touch was booed in relation to the Kúdela abuse; UEFA found insufficient evidence of a racial motive and did not punish the club.

International career
Kamara represented Finland at under-19 and under-21 level. He was an unused substitute for the senior side in a friendly against Estonia in June 2015. On 9 November 2017, he made his debut in a 3–0 victory over the same country in a friendly match. He scored his first international goal to conclude a 2–0 home win over Greece in the UEFA Nations League on 15 October 2018.

Kamara was called up for Finland's first major tournament, the delayed UEFA Euro 2020 in June 2021.

Career statistics

Club

International

Scores and results list Finland's goal tally first, score column indicates score after each Kamara goal.

Honours

Rangers
Scottish Premiership: 2020–21
Scottish Cup: 2021–22
Scottish League Cup runner-up: 2019–20
 UEFA Europa League runner-up: 2021–22

Individual
 PFA Scotland Team of the Year: 2020–21 Scottish Premiership

References

External links

1995 births
Living people
Footballers from Tampere
Finnish footballers
Finland youth international footballers
Finland under-21 international footballers
Finland international footballers
Association football midfielders
Southend United F.C. players
Arsenal F.C. players
Colchester United F.C. players
Dundee F.C. players
Rangers F.C. players
English Football League players
Scottish Professional Football League players
UEFA Euro 2020 players
Finnish expatriate footballers
Expatriate footballers in England
Expatriate footballers in Scotland
Finnish expatriate sportspeople in England
Finnish expatriate sportspeople in Scotland
Finnish people of Sierra Leonean descent